Hachette Books, formerly Hyperion Books, is a general-interest book imprint of the Perseus Books Group, which is a division of Hachette Book Group and ultimately a part of Lagardère Group. Established in 1990, Hachette publishes general-interest fiction and non-fiction books for adults. A former subsidiary of The Walt Disney Company, it was originally named after Hyperion Avenue, the location of Walt Disney Studios prior to 1939. Hachette took over a 1,000 book backlist when Hyperion was purchased from Disney in 2013 with 250 bestselling novels, including Mitch Albom’s The Five People You Meet in Heaven.

History

Hyperion Books

Hyperion Books was founded in 1990 from scratch with no backlist under Disney's then-C.E.O. Michael Eisner and Robert S. Miller. Hyperion's strategy was to not purchase backlists, but to go after newer or lesser known authors and to "capitalize on Disney talent and products." Hyperion Books for Children (HBC) and Disney Press were also launched in 1990. The Disney Publishing Group was incorporated in January 1992 and included the already formed Hyperion Books, Hyperion Books for Children, Disney Press and other units. Hyperion took losses until 1994 when it published its most successful book to date, Don't Stand Too Close to a Naked Man by Tim Allen with 1.1 million copies sold. In March 1995 with the market too crowded with Disney books, Hyperion Books for Children merged with Disney Press. Hyperion Books for Children started a new imprint, Jump at the Sun, on September 7, 1998 for the African-American children's market. On April 9, 1999, Hyperion Books, sans its for-children stable mate, was transferred to Disney's ABC Group.

On May 14, 2004, Hyperion and Wenner Media agreed to a publishing and distribution deal for Wenner's new imprint Wenner Books beginning in spring 2005. On September 28, 2007, Hyperion Books moved its offices from the ABC headquarters at 77 West 66th Street to the Disney Publishing Worldwide offices at 114 Fifth Avenue, occupying two floors of the building, during the course of a partial move of Hyperion's operations to White Plains, New York.

Hachette Books
On June 28, 2013, Hachette announced that it would acquire Hyperion from Disney. In the deal, Hachette will take on Hyperion's adult trade list including works by Mitch Albom and Michael J. Fox and 25 books to be published. Hyperion's books related to existing Disney–ABC Television Group properties and young adult titles will join the Disney-Hyperion imprint at Disney Publishing Worldwide. On March 12, 2014, Hyperion was renamed Hachette Books, with the naming of Crown Archetype's editor-in-chief Mauro DiPreta as the new unit's vice president and publisher. On October 12, 2017, Hachette Book Group discontinued the Weinstein Books imprint due to the Harvey Weinstein sexual abuse allegations, with the imprint's staff and titles transferred to Hachette Books.

On January 8, 2015, Black Dog & Leventhal (BD&L) was purchased by Hachette Book Group and became an imprint of Hachette Books, with J.P. Leventhal, continuing his position as publisher of the imprint he founded in 1992. With Leventhal's announcement of his retirement on October 17, 2017, BD&L imprint was transferred to Running Press. In 2018, Hachette Books became an imprint of Perseus Books Group, with publisher DiPreta exiting the unit. Concurrently, Da Capo Press and Da Capo's Lifelong became part of Hachette. On April 8, 2019, the Perseus Books Group hired Disney Publishing's Mary Ann Naples as vice president and publisher of Hachette Books.

Best sellers
 The Last Lecture by Randy Pausch
 Scar Tissue by Anthony Kiedis
 The Ghost and The Goth by Stacey Kade
 The Five People You Meet in Heaven by Mitch Albom
 Always Looking Up by Michael J. Fox
 Jamie’s Food Revolution by chef Jamie Oliver
 The Middle Place by Kelly Corrigan
 Monsters of Templeton by Lauren Groff
 The Tender Bar by JR Moehringer
 The Domestic Goddess by chef Nigella Lawson
 Don't Stand Too Close to a Naked Man (1994) by Tim Allen
 The Beardstown Ladies' Common-Sense Investment Guide (1995)
 Dixie City Jam by James Lee Burke
 Wayne's World by Mike Myers
 "Regis & Kathie Lee"
 "Birnbaum's Walt Disney World"
 "Hope's Boy" by Andrew Bridge
 Pulp Fiction screenplay via Miramax
 Percy Jackson & the Olympians, The Heroes of Olympus, The Kane Chronicles, and Magnus Chase and the Gods of Asgard by Rick Riordan
 Artemis Fowl by Eoin Colfer
The War on Normal People by 2020 Democratic Candidate Andrew Yang

References

External links 
 

.
Book publishing companies based in New York (state)
Publishing companies based in New York City
Publishing companies established in 1990
1990 establishments in New York (state)
Former subsidiaries of The Walt Disney Company
Lagardère Media
Michael Eisner